The Little River of the Chef (French: Petite rivière du Chef) is a tributary of the La Loche River (Ashuapmushuan River), flowing into the unorganized territory of Lac-Ashuapmushuan, Quebec, into the Regional County Municipality (RCM) of Le Domaine-du-Roy, in the administrative region of Saguenay-Lac-Saint-Jean, in Quebec, in Canada.

The "Little River of the Chef" flows in the townships of Aigremont, Denault and Cazeneuve. The upper part of the river runs through the Ashuapmushuan Wildlife Reserve. Forestry is the main economic activity of this valley; recreational tourism activities, second.

The forest road R0203 (North-South direction) serves the lower part of the valley of the "Little River of the Chef"; this road starts at the junction of route 167 which links Chibougamau to Saint-Félicien, Quebec. Going up north, the R0203 road branches off to the northeast to reach the Hilarion River.

The "Little River of the Chef" is usually frozen from early November to mid-May, however, safe ice circulation is generally from mid-November to mid-April.

Geography

Toponymy 
The toponym "Petite rivière du Chef" was officialized on December 5, 1968, at the Commission de toponymie du Québec, when it was created.

Notes and references

See also 

Rivers of Saguenay–Lac-Saint-Jean
Le Domaine-du-Roy Regional County Municipality